Ben County is in Chaharmahal and Bakhtiari province, Iran. The capital of the county is the city of Ben. At the 2006 census, the region's population (as Ben District of Shahrekord County) was 27,731 in 7,056 households. The following census in 2011 counted 29,841 people in 8,509 households. At the 2016 census, the population was 28,326, in 8,799 households, by which time the district had been separated from the county to form Ben County.

Administrative divisions

The population history and structural changes of Ben County's administrative divisions over three consecutive censuses are shown in the following table. The latest census shows two districts, four rural districts, and two cities.

References

 

Counties of Chaharmahal and Bakhtiari Province